Night and Day is a 2008 South Korean comedy-drama film written and directed by Hong Sang-soo, starring Kim Young-ho and Park Eun-hye. The film competed for the Golden Bear at the 58th Berlin International Film Festival.

Storyline 
In the summer of 2007, Kim Seong-nam, a painter in his forties, travels to Paris, France to escape arrest for smoking marijuana, leaving his wife behind in Korea. While there he meets an ex-girlfriend, Min-seon, and is introduced to a small community of Korean artists.

Cast 
 Kim Young-ho as Kim Seong-nam, a painter
 Park Eun-hye as Lee Yoo-jeong, a student in painting major at the ENSB-A
 Hwang Soo-jung as Han Seong-in, Seong-nam's wife
 Gi Ju-bong as Mr. Jang, a host of the guest house
 Kim Yoo-jin as Jang Min-seon, Seong-nam's ex-girlfriend
 Seo Min-jeong as Jo Hyeon-joo, Yoo-jeong's roommate
 Jeong Ji-hye as Jeong Ji-hye, Yoo-jeong's college junior
 Lee Sun-kyun as Yoon Kyeong-soo, a student from North Korea
 Lee Jeong-hoon as Teacher Jang

Release 
Night and Day premiered at the 58th Berlin International Film Festival on 12 February 2008. It was released in South Korean theatres on 28 February, and as of 13 July had received a total of 13,928 admissions with a gross of $75,557.

Awards and nominations 
Night and Day won the award for Best Film at the 17th Buil Film Awards, held on 9 October 2008. Hong Sang-soo was nominated for Best Screenplay at the 2008 Asia Pacific Screen Awards.

References

External links 
 
 
 
 
 

2008 films
2008 comedy-drama films
South Korean independent films
South Korean comedy-drama films
Adultery in films
Films about the arts
Films set in 2007
Films set in Paris
Films shot in Paris
Films directed by Hong Sang-soo
Sponge Entertainment films
2000s Korean-language films
2008 independent films
2000s South Korean films